Rebecca Durrell (née Nixon; born 25 August 1988) is a British professional racing cyclist, who currently rides for UCI Women's Continental Team . During the 2017 Matrix Fitness Grand Prix series Durrell won the final round in Stevenage and the overall individual crown.

Major results
2018
1st Lincoln Grand Prix
2019
 1st  National Criterium Championships

See also
 List of 2016 UCI Women's Teams and riders

References

External links
 

1988 births
Living people
British female cyclists
Place of birth missing (living people)
21st-century British women